Nosophora quadrisignata is a moth in the family Crambidae. It was described by Frederic Moore in 1884. It is found in Sri Lanka.

References

Moths described in 1884
Spilomelinae
Moths of Sri Lanka